The 1998 IPB Czech Indoor was a men's tennis tournament played on indoor carpet in Ostrava, Czech Republic that was part of the International Series of the 1998 ATP Tour. It was the fifth edition of the tournament and was held from 19 October – 25 October.

Seeds
Champion seeds are indicated in bold text while text in italics indicates the round in which those seeds were eliminated.

Draw

Finals

Top half

Bottom half

References

1998 ATP Tour
1998